String Quartet No. 14 is the one of a series of seventeen works in the medium by the Brazilian composer Heitor Villa-Lobos, and was written in 1953. A performance lasts approximately seventeen minutes.

History
Villa-Lobos composed his Fourteenth Quartet in Rio de Janeiro in 1953 on a commission from the University of Michigan for the Stanley Quartet (Gilbert Ross and Emil Raab, violins; Robert Courte, viola; Oliver Edel, cello), to whom the score is dedicated. The Stanley Quartet gave the first performance in Ann Arbor as part of the sixty-ninth concert of the University of Michigan School of Music's 1953–54 season on Tuesday, 9 March 1954. It was preceded on the programme by Haydn's Quartet in C Major, Op. 74, No. 1, and followed by Beethoven's Quartet in B-flat major, Op. 130.

Analysis
As with most of Villa-Lobos's quartets, there are four movements:
 Allegro 
 Andante 
 Scherzo (Vivace) 
 Molto allegro

All four movements of this quartet are in ternary, ABA form.

The second movement is nostalgic in manner, opening with a sixteen-bar, desolate, chromatic, and atonal fugato. The central section is strongly contrasted, using a theme in a tonal, popular-music style.

Discography
Chronological, by date of recording.
 Heitor Villa-Lobos: String Quartets Nos. 4, 6 and 14. Danubius Quartet (Judit Tóth and Adél Miklós, violins; Cecilia Bodolai, viola; Ilona Wibli, cello). Recorded at the Hungaroton Studios in Budapest, 18–19, 22–25 April, and 20–23 May 1991. CD recording, 1 disc: digital, 12 cm, stereo. Marco Polo 8.223391. A co-production with Records International. Germany: HH International, Ltd., 1992.
 Villa-Lobos: Quatuors a Cordes Nos. 12–13–14. Quatuor Bessler-Reis (Bernardo Bessler, Michel Bessler, violins; Marie-Christine Springuel, viola; Alceu Reis, cello). Recorded at Multi Studio in Rio de Janeiro, June–July 1991, and at Studio Master in Rio de Janeiro, July 1989. CD recording, 1 disc: digital, 12 cm, stereo. Le Chant du Monde LDC 278 1066. France: [S.n.], 1991.
 Also issued as part of Villa-Lobos: Os 17 quartetos de cordas / The 17 String Quartets. Quarteto Bessler-Reis and Quarteto Amazônia. CD recording, 6 sound discs: digital, 12 cm, stereo. Kuarup Discos KCX-1001 (KCD 045, M-KCD-034, KCD 080/1, KCD-051, KCD 042). Rio de Janeiro: Kuarup Discos, 1996.
 Villa-Lobos: String Quartets, Volume 2. Quartets Nos. 3, 8, 14. Cuarteto Latinoamericano (Saúl Bitrán, Arón Bitrán, violins; Javier Montiel, viola; Alvaro Bitrán, cello). Recorded at the Troy Savings Bank Music Hall in Troy, NY, March 1995. Music of Latin American Masters. CD recording, 1 disc: digital, 12 cm, stereo. Dorian DOR-90220. Troy, NY: Dorian Recordings, 1996.
 Reissued as part of Heitor Villa-Lobos: The Complete String Quartets. 6 CDs + 1 DVD with a performance of Quartet No. 1 and interview with the Cuarteto Latinoamericano. Dorian Sono Luminus. DSL-90904. Winchester, VA: Sono Luminus, 2009.
 Also reissued (without the DVD) on Brilliant Classics 6634.

Filmography
 Villa-Lobos: A integral dos quartetos de cordas. Quarteto Radamés Gnattali (Carla Rincón, Francisco Roa, violins; Fernando Thebaldi, viola; Hugo Pilger, cello); presented by Turibio Santos. Recorded from June 2010 to September 2011 at the Palácio do Catete, Palácio das Laranjeiras, and the Theatro Municipal, Rio de Janeiro. DVD and Blu-ray (VIBD11111), 3 discs. Rio de Janeiro: Visom Digital, 2012.

References

Cited sources

Further reading
 Béhague, Gerard. 1979. Music in Latin America: An Introduction. New Jersey: Prentice-Hall.
 Béhaque, Gerard. 1994. Heitor Villa-Lobos: The Search for Brazil's Musical Soul. Austin: Institute of Latin American Studies, University of Texas at Austin.
 Béhague, Gerard. 2003. Villa-Lobos, Heitor: String Quartets, Cuarteto Latinoamericano. [review] Latin American Music Review / Revista de Música Latinoamericana 24, no. 2 (Autumn–Winter): 293–94.
 Estrella, Arnaldo. 1978. Os quartetos de cordas de Villa-Lobos, second edition. Rio de Janeiro: Museu Villa-Lobos, Ministério da Educação e Cultura.
 Farmer, Virginia. 1973. "An Analytical Study of the Seventeen String Quartets of Heitor Villa-Lobos". DMA diss. Urbana: University of Illinois at Urbana-Champaign.
 Gilman, Bruce. 1999. "Enigma de vanguardia", translated by Juan Arturo  Brennan. Pauta: Cuadernos de teoría y crítica musical 17, no. 69 (January–March): 29–34.
 Macedo Ribeiro, Roberto. 2000. "A escrita contrapontística nos quartetos de cordas de Heitor Villa-Lobos". In Anais do I Colóquio de Pesquisa de Pós-Graduação, edited by Marisa Rezende and Mário Nogueira, 71–76. Rio de Janeiro: Universidade Federal do Rio de Janeiro (UFRJ) (Escola de Música).
 Morton, Lawrence. 1959. "Heitor Villa-Lobos: String Quartet, No. 9, 1945. New York: Southern Music Publishing Co., 1957; Heitor Villa-Lobos: Quatorzieme quatuor a cordes. Paris: Max Eschig; U. S. A.: Associated Music Publishers, New York, 1958."  Notes 16, no. 2 (March): 313–14.
 Tarasti, Eero. 2009. "Villa-Lobos's String Quartets". In Intimate Voices: The Twentieth-Century String Quartet, vol. 1: Debussy to Villa-Lobos, edited by Evan Jones, 223–55. Eastman Studies in Music 70. Rochester, NY: University of Rochester Press. ; ; .

String quartets by Heitor Villa-Lobos
1953 compositions
Music dedicated to ensembles or performers